Pine Creek is a small town in the Katherine region of the Northern Territory, Australia. As at the 2021 Census there were 318 residents of Pine Creek, which is the fourth largest town between Darwin and Alice Springs.

Pine Creek is just off the Stuart Highway (the road from the south to Darwin) and is still a notable tourist stop. A number of events are held each year to promote the town in the region. These include the annual Goldrush Festival, featuring the NT Gold Panning championships and Didgeridoo Jam, the Pine Creek Rodeo and Pine Creek Races. In 2005 a prominent resident of Pine Creek, Edward Ah Toy, was recognised as the Northern Territorian of the year.

History

Pine Creek was traditionally the junction of three large indigenous ethnic groups. Stretching south-west from the Stuart Highway towards, and across, the Daly River was the land traditionally associated with the Wagiman people. The land east of the Stuart Highway and south of the Kakadu Highway, stretching to Katherine, was associated with the Jawoyn people, and north of the Kakadu Highway was land traditionally associated with Waray.

European influx appears to have started during construction of the Overland Telegraph line from Adelaide to Darwin: in 1870, workers first crossed a creek that was notable for the pine trees that grew on its banks. In 1871, workers with Darwent & Dalwood digging holes for the telegraph line found gold, triggering another Australian gold rush. The town grew rapidly with the influx of miners, many of whom were Singaporean Chinese immigrants brought into the Territory from 1874 as a source of cheap labour.  By 1873, a telegraph repeater station and police camp had been established. By 1875 there were two hotels, The Royal Mail and The Standard, competing for business. A public school opened in the town in 1899. By the 1890s, up to 15 mines were operating in the area, and the town's population exceeded 3000 people.

The Territory's first tin mine commenced operations near Pine Creek in 1878, but was soon eclipsed by the deposits at Maranboy.  The Eleanor Reef at Pine Creek was discovered in 1880, some 9 years before the railway reached the town. The Jensen Gold Mining Co. established a mine on the reef about a mile from the southern boundary of the Pine Creek Railway reserve. A battery was built in 1893 to crush ore from the Eleanor and another reef and, concurrently, they ordered tramway materials from England. The tramway was operational by 1895. The tramway was still in place in 1912 when surveyors plotted the route of the extension of the North Australia Railway from Pine Creek to Katherine, but was abandoned by 1914 when construction teams arrived. The locomotive was moved to the Maranboy tin mines in 1916.

North Australia Railway
The first stage of the lightly built narrow-gauge North Australia Railway was built between Port Darwin and Pine Creek, reaching the town in 1889. Additional sidings were added to the rail yards in 1914 in preparation for the extension of the line south to Emungalan (Katherine), which opened in 1917. An unsealed road was constructed in the 1930s, following the same route as the railway from Adelaide River to Larrimah, and passing through Pine Creek. Much of this poorly maintained road would later become the Stuart Highway.

The railway closed in 1976. The old Pine Creek railway station (1888) and some rolling stock remained and were preserved as the Pine Creek Railway Precinct; Commonwealth Railways steam locomotive NF5, built in 1877, was restored to operational condition in 2001. 

Mining
Between 1967 and 1974, iron ore was mined at Frances Creek, about 25 kilometres north of Pine Creek. About 6 million tonnes of ore were extracted over that period. In June 2007, Territory Resources (trading under the name Territory Iron) commenced mining iron ore and gold at the Frances Creek mine. In October 2014, the mine was used for filming an episode of the BBC television program Top Gear. The mine ceased operations in January 2015, after a drop in the price of iron ore, leading to the departure of many local employees. In April 2020, it was announced that mining would resume in May 2020, after a 5-year hiatus.

In 1985, Pine Creek Goldfields Limited opened an open-cut gold mine adjacent to the town, on the site of an old shaft mine. Over a ten-year period, it yielded  of gold. Since closure, its main pit has been filled with water to prevent acid build-up. A lookout is located at the south-western end of Moule Street.

World War II
During World War II, the Australian Army set up 65th Australian Camp Hospital near Pine Creek. An airfield was constructed between May and July 1942 by the US Army 808th Engineer Aviation Battalion as an emergency landing ground and to serve the military units based in the town. Unlike many Top End towns, Pine Creek was not bombed by the Japanese during the war, although Japanese reconnaissance aircraft are reported to have overflown the town on at least one occasion.

It was also during the war years that sealed, all weather sections of the Stuart Highway were constructed, providing transport alternatives to the railway. Work on the road was completed in this area by 1944.

Heritage places
The following places are listed on the Northern Territory Heritage Register:

Pine Creek Bakery
Pine Creek Post Office and Repeater Station
North Australia Railway (NAR) remnants at Pine Creek
Old Pine Creek Butchery
Old Playford Club Hotel
Old Bonrook Station Homestead
Pine Creek Railway Precinct, including a railway museum.

Notes

References

External links 
Pine Creek Town Council

Mining towns in the Northern Territory
Towns in the Northern Territory
Victoria Daly Region